Jerry Slocum is an American historian, collector and author specializing on the field of mechanical puzzles. He worked as an engineer at Hughes Aircraft prior to retiring and dedicating his life to puzzles.

His personal puzzle collection, numbering over 40,000 mechanical puzzles and 4,500 books, is believed to be the world's largest.  In 2006, the Association of Game & Puzzle Collectors awarded Slocum with the Sam Loyd Award.

In 2006, Slocum donated over 30,000 puzzles to the Lilly Library at Indiana University:  marking the first time a major collection of puzzles was made available in an academic setting.

Slocum's first book, Puzzles Old and New, published in 1986, was the first comprehensive book to include all types of mechanical puzzles with hundreds of color illustrations of antique puzzles. In the introduction Martin Gardner predicted that the book would "remain a classic for decades."

Slocum has appeared on The Tonight Show Starring Johnny Carson, Martha Stewart Living, and eight other nationwide TV shows.

Slocum Puzzle Foundation 
In 1993, Slocum founded the Slocum Puzzle Foundation, a non-profit organization dedicated to educating the public on puzzles through puzzle collecting, exhibitions, publications, and communications.

International Puzzle Party 
Slocum also founded the International Puzzle Party in 1978. The first eight International Puzzle Parties (an event dedicated to discussing, showing, and trading mechanical puzzles) were held in Slocum's Beverly Hills living room and evolved into an annual by-invitation-only event rotating between North America, Europe, and Asia.

Works
Slocum has authored or co-authored more than a dozen books on the topic of puzzles.

 Puzzles Old and New, with Jack Botermans (1986) 
 The Puzzle Arcade (1996) 
 The Tangram Book, with Dieter Gebhardt, Jack Botermans, Monica Ma, Xiaohe Ma 2003  Sterling Publishing Company (Comprehensive, illustrated history, 1,756 problem figures) beautiful photos of historic Tangrams from Asia, Europe and America
 The 15 Puzzle, with Dic Sonneveld, 2006  Slocum Puzzle Foundation.
 The Cube: The Ultimate Guide to the World's Bestselling Puzzle, with David Singmaster, Wei-Hwa Huang, Dieter Gebhardt, Geert Hellings, and an introduction by Ernő Rubik, 2006 , Black Dog & Leventhal Publishers, Inc. Covers the history of the Rubik's Cube, with solutions to the 2x2 and 3x3 puzzles.

See also
 Nob Yoshigahara Puzzle Design Competition

References

Sources
Appearance on Martha Stewart Living

External links
 The Slocum Puzzle web site
 The Jerry Slocum Mechanical Puzzle Collection Online

Puzzle designers
Living people
Place of birth missing (living people)
American art collectors
American male non-fiction writers
Recreational mathematicians
1931 births
20th-century American male writers
20th-century American non-fiction writers
21st-century American male writers
21st-century American non-fiction writers
Writers from Chicago